Bayé may refer to:

People
 Betty Bayé (born 1946), American journalist

Places
 Bayé, Burkina Faso
 Bayé, Kayes, Mali